The Oppenheimer Stadium disaster, or Orkney Disaster, at the Oppenheimer Stadium in the city of Orkney ( from Johannesburg) in South Africa's North West province was the second-worst sporting incident in South African history, with 42 deaths.

On 13 January 1991, there was a preseason "friendly" association football match between Kaizer Chiefs and Orlando Pirates. The stadium had a capacity of 23,000, but about 30,000 fans were admitted and were not separated according to the team they supported. The referee upheld a goal scored by the Chiefs, and supporters of the Pirates objected. Pirates fans threw cans and fruit at Chiefs fans, and allegedly some knife-wielding Pirates fans attacked Chiefs fans. As panicking fans tried to escape the brawls were trampled or crushed to death against riot-control fences.

The worst sporting incident in South Africa, the Ellis Park Stadium disaster in 2001, involved fans of the same two teams.

See also 
 Oppenheimer Stadium

References

External links 
(see No 12, Orkney Disaster)

Human stampedes in 1991
Stadium disasters
Man-made disasters in South Africa
1991 in South Africa
1991 in South African sport
Sport in North West (South African province)
Soccer in South Africa
Kaizer Chiefs F.C.
Orlando Pirates F.C.
Association football controversies